Dinelli's doradito (Pseudocolopteryx dinelliana) is a species of bird in the family Tyrannidae. It is found in Argentina, Bolivia, and Paraguay. Its natural habitats are subtropical or tropical dry shrubland, subtropical or tropical dry lowland grassland, and swamps. It is threatened by habitat loss.

The common name and Latin binomial commemorate the Argentinian biologist Luis Dinelli.

References

Pseudocolopteryx
Birds of Argentina
Birds described in 1905
Taxonomy articles created by Polbot